Yuliia Dzhima (born 19 September 1990) is a Ukrainian World Cup level biathlete. She is Olympic champion in women's relay, multiple World championships medalist. She is one of the most successful Ukrainian biathletes of the 2010s.

Career
She took up biathlon in Kyiv, where she lives. At the beginning of her sporting career, she wasn't seen as a promising rising athlete. She didn't show good results in skiing, so trainers were doubtful whether she would be a good biathlete.

In January 2008, she competed in her first international competition, Junior World Championships in German Ruhpolding. Next three years, she was a member of the Ukrainian junior team. Dzhima had pretty good results, including bronze in the individual race at 2009 Junior European Championships.

On 4 January 2012, she debuted in German Oberhof in the women's relay with a team which later would win Olympic gold. Then they finished 8th. In two days, she had her first race in sprint, finishing 34th. Next season, 2012–13, she had one victory and two podiums in relay races. In 2013–14 season, she had her first podium in pursuit in Austrian Hochfilzen, finishing second. At the 2013 World Championships, she took silver in relay competition.

Together with Vita Semerenko, Valentina Semerenko and Olena Pidhrushna she won the gold medal in the Women's relay at the 2014 Winter Olympics, in Sochi, Russia.

The following two seasons after the Olympics weren't very successful, but she had some Top-10 results. Her performances improved in 2016–17 season: in all World Cup rankings, she achieved her highest rankings, including a place in the Top-10 of the general World Cup classification for the first time in her career. That year she won three medals at 2017 European Championships in Polish Duszniki-Zdrój, which was the most successful European championships for Yuliia. Next month she received her second silver relay World Championships medal.

Pre-Olympic 2017–18 season started very successfully for her since in two opening races in Swedish Östersund, she finished third. On 28 December 2017, she participated in the prestigious commercial competition World Team Challenge, where she placed 5th together with Belgian biathlete Michael Rösch. She qualified to represent Ukraine at the 2018 Winter Olympics. Due to illness she didn't take part in sprint. Besides, Ukrainian coaches thought she would qualify to mass start, but they were incompetent in rules regarding mass start qualification, so Yuliia participated only in the individual race, where she was 20th. In relay competitions she was 7th in mixed relay and 11th in the classical relay.

She received the Best Athlete of a Month award from National Olympic Committee of Ukraine in January 2017.

Personal life
Yuliia's father is a former Ukrainian biathlete Valentyn Dzhyma who participated at 1994 Winter Olympics and finished his career the following year. Her mother is also an athlete.

Since childhood, her hobby has been painting.

Dzhima studied foreign languages and social communications at Sumy State University.

After 2018 Winter Olympics, there were some rumors that Yuliia Dzyma being younger than 23 years, was dating the head coach of the Ukrainian women's national team Uroš Velepec.

Biathlon results

Olympic Games
1 medal (1 gold)

World Championships
4 medals (2 silver, 3 bronze)

World Cup

Individual podiums

Relay podiums

Positions

Individual victories

*Results are from IBU races which include the Biathlon World Cup, Biathlon World Championships and the Winter Olympic Games.

References

External links

1990 births
Living people
Ukrainian female biathletes
Sportspeople from Kyiv
Biathlon World Championships medalists
Biathletes at the 2014 Winter Olympics
Biathletes at the 2018 Winter Olympics
Biathletes at the 2022 Winter Olympics
Olympic biathletes of Ukraine
Medalists at the 2014 Winter Olympics
Olympic gold medalists for Ukraine
Olympic medalists in biathlon
Sumy State University alumni